Aryabhata is an Indian astronomer (476 – 550) and author of the Aryabhatiya.

Aryabhata may also refer to:

Āryabhaṭa numeration
Aryabhata (satellite)
Aryabhata (crater), lunar crater